The climbing liana, sometimes a shrub, Mallotus repandus, is a species of plant in the Euphorbiaceae, or spurge, family. It is native to Tropical and Sub-tropical Asia, Wallacea, New Guinea and Queensland on the Australian continent and New Caledonia.

Description
Usually growing as a liana, sometimes a climbing shrub or a shrub, it can grow 5-10 tall or in length, at times the stems can be up to 22 cm in diameter.

It is one of the only Mallotus species to grow as a liana.
Bark is dark brownish grey.
Branchlets, petioles and inflorescences are dull yellowish-brown. The blaze (longitudinal cut of the bark) is finely layered, with an odour of green peas (Pisum sativum). The simple and broad leaves are slightly peltate.
Flowers are yellowish.  It flowers in China from March to May, and fruits from June to September.
The species can be distinguished from other Mallotus species, by its being a climber and that its upper leaf surface have more than 2 marginal extrafloral nectaries, and that its fruits are (1-or) 2- or 3-locular.
A molecular phylogeny study has M. repandus as a sister species of M. phillippensis (Lam.) Muell.Arg.
The indumentum/hairs on the leaves of the plant are simple and multicellular, a trait only found amongst the Mallotus genera in the closely related M. philippensis.

Habitat
The climber/shrub grows locally scattered in the understorey of primary to secondary forest, and in disturbed sites and scrub. It can be found at forest edges, mangrove swamp edges, road and river sides, ridges, steep slopes and dry ground. It is able to grow on various soil types, including those derived from limestone and granite, on sandy loam and rocky soils. It occurs from sea level to 1500m altitude. It generally flowers and fruits throughout the year.
Grows in both lowland and upland rain forest in Queensland, at elevations from near sea level to 750m.
In Southeast Asia, the liana/shrub occurs in secondary vegetation formations or on the edges of dense forests.
In China it is found in thickets, forest and their fringes, hills and mountain valleys below 100m.
The plant is sometimes harmed by infestation with the parasite plant Cuscuta japonica (Japanese dodder). It provides food for the moth Acrocercops zopherandra.
It is one of three Mallotus species that host the fungus Cercospora malloti.

Distribution
New Caledonia, Queensland (where it is found in Cape York Peninsula, the northeast and the southeast. but not coastal central Queensland), New Guinea, Lesser Sunda Islands, Maluku, Sulawesi, Jawa, Borneo, Philippines, Taiwan, North-central, Southeast and South-central Zhongguo/China (including Guangxi, Hainan, Guangdong, Fujian, Zhejiang, Anhui, Henan, southern Shanxi, southern Gansu, Hubei, Sichuan, southern Jiangxi, Hunan, Guizhou and Yunnan), Vietnam, Laos, Cambodia, Thailand, Malaysia, Sumatera, Andaman Islands, Nicobar Islands, Myanmar, Bangladesh, India (including Tripura, Assam, Sikkim, West Bengal, Bihar, Uttar Pradesh, Odisha, Maharashtra, Andhra Pradesh, Karnataka, Tamil Nadu and Kerala, East Himalaya, Nepal, Sri Lanka.
While widespread, it is absent in certain areas, such as Borneo.

Common names
Names for M. repandus include: 

 climbing mallotus (Australia);
 waithied (Lifou);
 wananugapok (Waskuk)];
 toho (Wagu);
 ngontoen (New Guinea);
 nono nuifmetan ((Dawan);
 bina (Rote);
 keterakaba, ikur wase, rowe (Lesser Sunda Islands);
 katjoe-kilang,  (Jawa/Java);
 panuálan (Tagalog);
 , ambao, tagbanua, tapin (Philippines);
 石岩枫, shi yan feng (Chinese);
 ma-pawp-kua (Lao);
 chumpu préi,  (Khmer);
 ku-ko-mu-ya (Malay);
 ngahlaing-bo, taw-thidin-nww (Myanmar);
  (Hindi); kanda-veltoo (Teling, India); watta-tali (India).

Uses
On the island of Rote, eastern Indonesia, the wood of this plant, bina, is one of two used to make the bars for meko ai (xylophone whose bars are made of wood), it is also recorded in an origin myth for this musical instrument.
In Cambodia, the wood is used to make charcoal for powder. In Kut Chum District, central northeast Thailand, it is used in folk-medicine as an antibiotic, while Northeastern Thai people use it to relieve bone-pain, while elsewhere in Thailand the bark is used in ethnomedicine to treat herpes simplex, inflammation and liver poisoning.

References

repandus
Flora of China
Flora of tropical Asia
Flora of Queensland
Flora of Taiwan
Flora of New Caledonia
Plants described in 1865